Asociația Club Sportiv Unirea Bascov, commonly known as Unirea Bascov, is a Romanian professional football club based in Bascov, Argeș County and currently playing in the Liga III.

History
The club was founded in 2007 as AS Valea Ursului. In 2014, the team merged with AS Bascov to formed Unirea Bascov.

In the 2014–15 season, led by coach Alin Lipa, the team won the county championship, but missed the promotion in Liga III, after being defeated 4–2 on aggregate by FC Aninoasa, the champion of Dâmbovița County.

After a 2nd place in the 2015–16 season, in 2016–17 season, the bears, with Alin Chița on the bench, won for the second time the county championship, but lost again the promotion 4–1 on aggregate in front of FC Avrig, the champion of Sibiu County.

Unirea Bascov, gained access to the third league in 2017–18 season, when has managed a historic triple for a Liga IV club, the team coached by FC Argeș former striker, Adrian Dulcea, won the Liga IV – Argeș County, the promotion play-off to Liga III and Romanian Cup county phase.

Honours

Leagues
Liga IV  – Argeș County
Winners (3): 2014–15, 2016–17, 2017–18
Runners-up (2): 2013–14, 2015–16

Liga V – Argeș County
Winners (1): 2011–12

Cups
Cupa României – Argeș County
Winners (3): 2013–14, 2015–16, 2017–18

Players

First-team squad

Out on loan

Club officials

Board of directors

Current technical staff

League history

References

External links

 FRF-AJF Profile

Association football clubs established in 2007
Football clubs in Argeș County
Liga III clubs
Liga IV clubs
2007 establishments in Romania